The Heather Blazing is the 1992 novel by Irish writer Colm Tóibín. It was the writer's second novel and allowed him to become a full-time fiction writer. The intensity of the prose and the emotional tension under the colder eye with which the events are seen, provided  him with a faithful readership both at home and abroad. It won the 1993 Encore Award for a second novel.

Plot summary
The novel tells the story of Eamon Redmond, a judge in the Irish High Court of the late twentieth century Ireland. It reconstructs his relationships with his wife and children through his life and the memories of a childhood marked by the death of his father. The County Wexford landscape and the death of the father are the narrative material, which Colm Tóibín would revisit again in The Blackwater Lightship.

The novel takes its title from a line from the song "Boolavogue", specifically "a rebel hand set the heather blazing".

The novel also plots the development of Fianna Fáil from the austere republicanism and style of Éamon de Valera to the corruption of the Charles Haughey era.

It has been said that this novel made Tóibín the heir of John McGahern. Amongst Women, a book by McGahern, has similar atmosphere to this book.

1992 Irish novels
Novels by Colm Tóibín
Novels set in County Wexford